Dillon Creek is a stream in Andrew County in the U.S. state of Missouri.

Dillon Creek was named after Abraham Dillon, the proprietor of a local sawmill.

See also
List of rivers of Missouri

References

Rivers of Andrew County, Missouri
Rivers of Missouri